Thomas Brent Funderburk  (born 1952 in Charlotte, North Carolina) is an awarded visual artist and W. L. Giles Distinguished Professor of Art at Mississippi State University where he has worked for several decades. He is known for his illustrated-lecture performances and workshops, as well as for exhibiting his watercolors and other visual artwork in the United States. Funderburk acknowledges influences by watercolor painters such as Edward  Reep, Charles E. Burchfield and Walter Inglis Anderson. His art has been featured in specialized art magazines.

Career
Funderburk graduated from East Carolina University School of Art and Design (Greenville, NC), receiving Bachelor's (BFA) and Master's (MFA) degrees in Fine art/Painting in 1975 and 1978 respectively.

He taught art at Nebraska Wesleyan University before joining the faculty at Mississippi State University, in the Department of Art, which he headed from 1995 to 2002.

Funderburk has conducted illustrated lecture performances, art workshops, and exhibitions in galleries and museums in the United States. 

Funderburk's watercolor series New Solar Myths and Flying World, both featured in Watercolor Artist magazine  (August 2016). 

In 2019-2020, Funderburk's pieces “Soul House (Red)”, “Anteroom”, “Angelus Vitae” and “Oaxaca” were recognized at several juried art competitions. In August - September 2021, the artist presented a solo exhibition Here and There: Brent Funderburk - Paintings and Drawings 1981–2021, at the Cullis Wade Depot Art Gallery, MSU campus (Starkville, MS).

Awards
At MSU, Funderburk received the John Grisham Faculty Excellence Award (1994), the Burlington Northern Excellence in Teaching Award (1986), the Ralph E. Powe Research Excellence Award (2015),  and the Southeastern Conference Faculty Achievement Award (2016). In 2015, he was named William L. Giles Distinguished Professor (2015).

In 2010 he was named "Official Artist" for the 2010 USA International Ballet Competition. Other professional Awards he received in recent years include  the Second  Award at the National Biennial  Art  Exhibition,  Visual  Arts   Center,  Punta  Gorda,  FL (2012), and the First Prize at the 42nd Rocky Mountain National Watermedia Exhibition, Foothills Art Center, Golden, CO (2015).

Gallery

References

External links
Brent Funderburk official website
Brent Funderburk MSU website
 Video: Gallery Views, Here and There: Brent Funderburk Paintings and Drawings 1981–2021

1952 births
Living people
American watercolorists
21st-century American painters
Artists from North Carolina
Mississippi State University faculty
American male painters
American art educators